Wisconsin Investment Partners, founded in 1999, is a venture capital fund backed by a Madison, Wisconsin angel investing group. The group has invested more than $20 million in more than 40 early-stage companies, and in 2014 was one of the 10 most active angel investing groups. The group has over 75 members.

In 2014, it invested $11,000 in each company that graduated from Gener8tor.

Wisconsin Investment Partners is an investor in Aver Informatics, software for bundled payments in which doctors, hospitals, and other health care providers accept a set amount for an episode of care, such as knee-replacement surgery. It has also invested in: FluGen, Murfie, Phoenix, Zurex Pharma, and SHINE Medical Technologies.

See also
 Argosy Foundation
 BrightStar Wisconsin Foundation
 Business incubator
 CSA Partners
 Gener8tor
 Seed accelerator
 Ward 4
 Wisconsin Economic Development Corporation
 Techstars
 Y Combinator (company)

References

 http://www.jsonline.com/business/wisconsin-investment-partners-named-regions-most-active-angel-investing-group-uc9lcra-204104291.html
 http://www.jsonline.com/business/wisconsin-investment-partners-to-invest-in-gener8tor-grads-b99239428z1-253639041.html
 http://www.kenoshanews.com/opinion/angel_investors_like_wisconsin_482513727.html
 http://host.madison.com/business/tom-still-great-lakes-angel-investors-are-putting-their-money/article_aa4d9332-e9d9-5635-9a03-c0fddda3b2e6.html
 http://www.jsonline.com/business/badger-fund-of-funds-already-a-success-b99470753z1-300503231.html
 http://www.xconomy.com/wisconsin/2014/11/06/wip-wisconsins-most-active-angel-group-adds-new-investors/
 http://host.madison.com/business/technology/biotech/tech-and-biotech-two-epic-competitors-join-forces-and-a/article_b310c2c0-e24d-5553-873a-3de0103dfb42.html
 http://www.slate.com/blogs/moneybox/2014/08/07/a_silicon_valley_bank_report_says_angel_investors_are_putting_their_money.html
 http://www.inc.com/kimberly-weisul/coasts-give-up-a-monopoly-on-angel-funding.html

External links

Financial services companies established in 1999
Organizations based in Madison, Wisconsin
Venture capital firms of the United States
1999 establishments in Wisconsin